BINGO (Baryon Acoustic Oscillations from Integrated Neutral Gas Observations) is a  transit radio telescope currently under construction that will observe redshifted hydrogen line emission (between z = 0.13 and 0.45) by intensity mapping to measure dark energy through baryon acoustic oscillations (BAO) in the radio frequency band.

The BINGO Project is an international collaboration headed by University of São Paulo, and also collaborates with researches from many countries, such as Brazil (National Institute of Space Research and Federal University of Campina Grande), China (University of Yangzhou) and England (University of Manchester and University College of London), besides support from institutions as Shanghai Jiao Tong (China), Institute for Basic Science (South Korea), IAP - Institut d’Astrophysique de Paris (France), University of Rome (Italy), IAC - Instituto de Astrofísica de Canarias (Spain), Max Planck Institute (Germany), KwaZulu-Natal University (South Africa), Universidade Federal de Itajuba (Brazil) and Universidade Federal do Cariri (Brazil).

The radio telescope is financed mainly by the Fundação de Amparo à Pesquisa do Estado de São Paulo (FAPESP) and by the Paraíba State Government, being supervised by the researcher Elcio Abdalla, from the Institute of Physics of University of São Paulo.

BINGO will consist of two mirrors: the 40-meter primary mirror reflects radiation from the sky to the secondary mirror that then directs the radiation to a focal plane of 28 horns. The signals will then be focused into a receiver and a spectrometer, after which the data will be analyzed through a data analysis pipeline on a computer.

The radio telescope will be installed in the Serra do Urubu, near the city of Aguiar, Paraíba, in Brazil's northeast. Other locations were evaluated in Uruguay, Rio Grande do Sul, São Paulo and Goiás. The choice of locality in Paraíba was due to the low level of radio frequency interference at the site.

The telescope will operate in the frequency range from 0.98 GHz to 1.26 GHz.
 With a feedhorn array of 28 receivers, it will map a 15° declination strip as the sky drifts past the field-of-view of the telescope. In March 2018, the telescope assembly and horn design and fabrication were under way in Brazil. Completion of construction is expected around 2022.

Science 
Hydrogen is the most abundant element of the Universe, composing approximately 75% of all usual known matter, also known as baryonic matter. It is available in many different ways, among which the neutral hydrogen (HI) is the most common one. According to Quantum Mechanics, only certain electronic transitions may occur, what limits the emitted photons energy, and thus which emission lines may be observed. Due to the interaction between the spin of the proton and the electron, there is a very small energy difference associated to the aligned spin state and the anti-parallel spin state, which produces a 21 cm wavelength photon, equivalent to a 1.4 GHz frequency. This process is called spin-flip transition, and is associated with the Hydrogen fine structure.

Consortium

BINGO is funded by the Foundation for Research Support of the State of São Paulo (FAPESP),  MCTIC – FINEP. The Institutions participating in the BINGO Project are:
Brazil: University of São Paulo (USP), Instituto Nacional de Pesquisas Espaciais (INPE), Universidade Federal de Campina Grande (UFCG), Universidade Federal de Itajubá (UNIFEI), Universidade Federal do Cariri (UFCA)
China: YangZhou University, Shanghai Jiao Tong University
United Kingdom: University College London, University of Manchester
France: Université Paris-Sud - Institute d'Astrophysique Spatiale

References 

Radio telescopes
Jodrell Bank Observatory
University of São Paulo